V'Alonee Robinson is a Bahamian sprinter (Born May 6, 1992) was selected for her country in the 4x100 meter relay at the 2012 Summer Olympics in London, England, but did not compete.

Career
V'Alonee Robinson was born on May 6, 1992. She attended St Augustine's College, before going to Auburn University in Auburn, Alabama. She competed for the University's Auburn Tigers team where she was coached by Henry Rolle.

At the Bahamas Olympic Trials in June 2012, she finished third in the women's 100 meters, completing the race in a time of 11.73 seconds behind Chandra Sturrup and Carmiesha Cox. Robinson competed in the 4x100 meter relay women's team for the Bahamas in July that year at the North American, Central American and Caribbean Athletic Association Under-23 Championships in Guanajuato City, Mexico. She won a silver medal alongside Krystal Bodie, Ivanique Kemp and Amara Jones in a time of 45.71 seconds. Individually, Robinson came fourth in the women's 100 meters with a time of 11.56 seconds.

In July 2012, it was announced by the Bahamas Olympic Committee that Robinson had been selected for that year's Summer Olympics in London, England, as part of the pool for the women's 4x100 meter relay alongside Chandra Sturrup, Christine Amertil, Sheniqua Ferguson, Debbie Ferguson-McKenzie and Anthonique Strachan. It was Robinson's first Olympic Games, who said on her arrival "This is a wonderful experience. This is the big stage for athletes and I’m just happy to be here. This is the Olympics – everything is big here. It's a great experience and I’m just happy to be a part of it". Although she had hoped to be selected out of the pool, but was not selected for the first heat and the relay team failed to qualify for the final.

References

External links
Auburn Bio
World Athletics Bio

Living people
Auburn Tigers women's track and field athletes
Bahamian female sprinters
Bahamian female hurdlers
1992 births
Athletes (track and field) at the 2018 Commonwealth Games
Commonwealth Games competitors for the Bahamas
Bahamian expatriate sportspeople in the United States